The Ligue 2 season 2004/2005, organised by the LFP was won by AS Nancy and saw the promotions of AS Nancy, Le Mans UC72 and Troyes AC, whereas Angers SCO and SC Bastia were relegated to National.

20 participating teams

 Amiens
 Angers
 Brest
 Châteauroux
 Clermont
 Créteil
 Dijon
 Grenoble
 Gueugnon
 Guingamp
 Laval
 Le Havre
 Le Mans
 Lorient
 Montpellier
 Nancy
 Niort
 Reims
 Sedan
 Troyes

League table

Results

Top goalscorers

External links
RSSSF archives of results
Official attendance on LFP site

Ligue 2 seasons
French
2004–05 in French football